Aristidi Kolaj (born 9 April 1999) is a professional footballer who plays for Italian side Pescara on loan from Alessandria. Born in Italy, he has represented Albania at youth level.

Club career

Como
He spent most of his youth career at Lega Pro club Como. He was called up to the senior squad in early 2017, but didn't make any appearances.

Sassuolo
In July 2017 he was transferred to Serie A club Sassuolo, where he played for their Under-19 squad in the 2017–18 and 2018–19 seasons. He was called up to the senior squad once for a Coppa Italia game, but remained on the bench.

Loan to Pro Patria
On 2 September 2019 he joined Serie C club Pro Patria on loan.

He made his professional Serie C debut for Pro Patria on 22 September 2019 in a game against Siena. He substituted Giuseppe Le Noci in the 89th minute and scored the only goal of the game in added time.

The loan was renewed for the 2020–21 season on 26 August 2020.

Alessandria
On 15 July 2021, he signed with Alessandria.

Loan to Pescara
On 12 August 2022, he joined Pescara on loan.

References

External links
 

1999 births
People from Marino, Lazio
Footballers from Lazio
Italian people of Albanian descent
Living people
Albanian footballers
Albania under-21 international footballers
Association football forwards
Como 1907 players
U.S. Sassuolo Calcio players
Aurora Pro Patria 1919 players
U.S. Alessandria Calcio 1912 players
Delfino Pescara 1936 players
Serie B players
Serie C players
Sportspeople from the Metropolitan City of Rome Capital